Isostola tenebrata is a moth of the family Erebidae. It was described by Erich Martin Hering in 1925. It is found in Bolivia.

References

Arctiinae
Moths described in 1925